The Minister charged with the administration of The Manitoba Lotteries Corporation Act is a government position in the province of Manitoba, Canada.  It is not a full ministerial portfolio, and is always held by a member of government with other responsibilities.

From January 16, 1981, to November 4, 1983, the minister was designated as responsible for the Lotteries and Gaming Control Act.

The current minister is Greg Selinger.

List of Minister charged with the administration of The Manitoba Lotteries Corporation Act

Source:   (with corrections from the Canadian Parliamentary Guide)

Manitoba Lotteries Corporation Act, Minister charged with the administration of The
Lotteries in Canada